Dhaliyur is a panchayat town in Coimbatore district  in the state of Tamil Nadu, India. Dhaliyur is a western suburb of Coimbatore city. It lies close to Kerala State border. It is located near the Western Ghats.

Demographics
 India census, Dhaliyur had a population of 8579. Males constitute 52% of the population and females 48%. Dhaliyur has an average literacy rate of 66%, higher than the national average of 59.5%: male literacy is 73% and, female literacy is 58%. In Dhaliyur, 10% of the population is under 6 years of age.

References

Suburbs of Coimbatore
Cities and towns in Coimbatore district